Tom McCarthy is a sound editor. He won the Academy Award for Best Sound Editing during the 65th Academy Awards. He won for Bram Stoker's Dracula. His Oscar was shared with David Stone.

Selected filmography

Blankman (1994)
Lost in Yonkers (1993)
Poetic Justice (1993)
Bram Stoker's Dracula (1992)
Sleepwalkers (1992)
All I Want for Christmas (1991)
My Girl (1991)
Toy Soldiers (1991)
Arachnophobia (1990)
Ghostbusters II (1989)
*batteries not included (1988)
Adventures in Babysitting (1987)
The Karate Kid, Part II (1986)
Heaven's Gate (1980)

References

External links

Sound editors
Best Sound Editing Academy Award winners
Living people
Date of birth missing (living people)
Year of birth missing (living people)